Basilica of the Sacred Heart of Jesus is a Roman Catholic church of the Jesuits in Kraków.

Architecture
This monumental Jesuit Church erected from 1909 to 1921 to a design by Franciszek Mączyński. Both its architecture, and the decoration and furnishings, with huge sculptures by Xawery Dunikowski, altar sculptures by Karol Hukan, and Jan Bukowski's murals are among the best examples of modern sacred art in Poland.

In 1960 it received the rank of a lesser basilica; in 1966 it was classified as a historical monument.

See also
 List of Jesuit sites
 The Lesser Polish Way

References

External links 

 Official Website
 Photographys

Sacred Heart
Jesuit churches in Poland
Basilica churches in Poland
20th-century Roman Catholic church buildings in Poland